Mount Armour, also named Boundary Peak 175, is a mountain in Alaska and British Columbia, located on the Canada–United States border, and part of the Southern Icefield Ranges of the Saint Elias Mountains.  It is named after John Douglas Armour (1830–1903), Chief Justice of the High Court of Ontario, and Justice of the Supreme Court of Canada, one of the original Canadian members of the Alaskan Boundary Tribunal in 1903 and who was involved in settling the Alaska boundary dispute between the United States and Canada.

See also
List of Boundary Peaks of the Alaska–British Columbia/Yukon border

References

Mountains of Alaska
Two-thousanders of British Columbia
Saint Elias Mountains
Canada–United States border
International mountains of North America
Mountains of Yakutat City and Borough, Alaska